Ladapo is both a surname and a given name of Yoruba origin. It is a contraction of Oladapo. Notable people with the name include:

 Freddie Ladapo (born 1993), English footballer
 Joseph Ladapo (born 1978–79), Surgeon-General of Florida
 Ladapo Ademola (1872–1962), Nigerian politician
 Tolu Ladapo (born 2004), Nigerian footballer

Yoruba given names
Yoruba-language surnames